Aldo-keto reductase family 1 member C2, also known as bile acid binding protein, 3α-hydroxysteroid dehydrogenase type 3, and dihydrodiol dehydrogenase type 2, is an enzyme that in humans is encoded by the AKR1C2 gene.

This gene encodes a member of the aldo/keto reductase superfamily, which consists of more than 40 known enzymes and proteins. These enzymes catalyze the conversion of aldehydes and ketones to their corresponding alcohols using NADH and/or NADPH as cofactors. The enzymes display overlapping but distinct substrate specificity. This enzyme binds bile acid with high affinity, and shows minimal 3α-hydroxysteroid dehydrogenase activity. This gene shares high sequence identity with three other gene members and is clustered with those three genes at chromosome 10p15-p14. Three transcript variants encoding two different isoforms have been found for this gene.

References

External links
 

EC 1.1.1